Manadath Mohammed Pillay Pareed Pillay is an Indian judge, jurist and lawyer who served as the 15th Chief Justice of Kerala. He was also appointed the first Chairman of the Kerala State Human Rights Commission in 1998 by the Governor of Kerala.

Early life 
Pareed Pillay was born in Aluva to M. K. Mohammed Pillay, the younger brother of prominent industrialist and philanthropist M. K. Mackar Pillay.

Pillay's brother, M. M. Abdul Khader was a senior advocate of the Supreme Court of India, who also served as the Advocate General of Kerala from 1969 to 1979.

References 

Chief Justices of the Kerala High Court
20th-century Indian judges
20th-century Indian lawyers
Manadath family
People from Aluva
Indian Muslims